Golam Rabbani is a politician and the former Member of Parliament of Netrokona-2.

Career
Rabbani was elected to parliament from Netrokona-2 as a Combined opposition candidate in 1988.

References

Living people
4th Jatiya Sangsad members
Year of birth missing (living people)